Saint-Apollinaire may refer to :

Canada
Saint-Apollinaire, Quebec, a municipality in Quebec

France
Saint-Apollinaire, Hautes-Alpes, a commune in the department of Hautes-Alpes
Saint-Apollinaire, Côte-d'Or, a commune in the department of Côte-d'Or
Saint-Apollinaire-de-Rias, a commune in the department of Ardèche

See also 
 Apollinaire (disambiguation)